Claud Morris (20 January 1920 – 21 May 2000) was a British newspaper owner who sought to make peace between Arabs and Israelis.

Family and education
Born at Angwinnack, Ludgvan, near Penzance, Cornwall, he became a junior reporter to The Cornishman at the age of nine. He had to leave school after failing the Cornwall Schools examination and went to work at nearby Collurian Farm which sold butter to Harrods. He first saw his wife while having a meal in London in the autumn of 1948. When asked who he would marry he pointed to Patricia Holton, an American writer and broadcaster, who he had never seen before and replied ″That one there″. Morris followed her to America and they married in January 1949.

He died in the cottage he was born in, after a series of strokes and survived by his wife, a son, William and two daughters.

Career
Leaving Collurian he worked as a porter at Penzance railway station for the Great Western Railway and with the free pass, that was part of his entitlement, he travelled to London to search for a post as a journalist. He landed his first job with The Dairy Farmer and later Farmers Weekly. He travelled to the West Indies in 1939 and Canada where he joined the Canadian Army at the outbreak of World War II, but was invalided out in 1941. Back in Britain, he started as a sub-editor on the Daily Express, and later as a personal assistant to Manny Shinwell, a Labour MP, writing speeches for members of the party. In 1949 he became political columnist for the Daily Mirror, and unsuccessfully standing as a Labour party candidate for Bristol West in 1950 and 1951.

In 1952, he bought a small South Wales newspaper, more than doubling its circulation in three years. After an abortive alliance with Roy Thomson to buy The Times in 1966, he continued building up his own publishing empire until 1970, when he joined forces with Christopher Mayhew, MP to produce a new magazine Middle East International. After Mayhew vetoed an article Morris wrote for publication, Morris published it in one of his own newspapers. This led to the resignation of key staff and a boycott by advertisers, causing the collapse of the paper.

Morris founded another newspaper, Voice of the Arab World and spent much of the next few decades travelling the Middle East. By the late 1980s, Morris had become convinced of the need to find a peaceful solution to the Arab-Israeli conflict, and in 1989 helped establish the Next Century Foundation.

He wrote a two-volume autobiography -I Bought a Newspaper (1963) and The Last Inch: a Middle East Odyssey (1997).

References

External links

1920 births
2000 deaths
People from Ludgvan, Cornwall
20th-century British newspaper publishers (people)
20th-century British newspaper founders
British expatriates in Canada